Ecocities may refer to:

Science and technology 
Ecocities,  a city designed with consideration of environmental impact.
Eco-cities, an eco-city is a city built off the principles of living within the means of the environment.

Software
ECOCITIES (software), an energy optimization software